Cochylimorpha fucatana is a species of moth of the family Tortricidae. It is found in Romania, Russia (Amur, Urals, Minussinsk), Turkmenistan and Mongolia.

The wingspan is 17–21 mm. Adults have been recorded on wing from June to July.

References

Moths described in 1883
Cochylimorpha
Moths of Europe
Moths of Asia